No Hay Banda is the debut album by Norwegian rock band Audrey Horne, released in 2005. The album title "No hay banda" literally means "There is no band" in Spanish; the title was inspired by a line from the David Lynch film Mulholland Drive.

Track listing
All tracks written by Audrey Horne.
"Dead" - 3:10
"Listening" - 3:45
"Get a Rope" - 3:29
"Deathhorse" - 4:55
"Confessions & Alcohol" - 4:11
"Candystore" - 4:53
"Blackhearted Visions" - 3:36
"Bleed" - 3:19
"Crust" - 3:50
"Weightless" - 5:43
"The Sweet Taste of Revenge" - 8:49

Personnel

Audrey Horne
Toschie - vocals
Ice Dale (Arve Isdal) - guitars & production
Thomas Tofthagen - guitars
Kjetil Greve - drums
Tom Cato Visnes - bass
Herbrand Larsen - keyboards & production

Production
Produced by Audrey Horne
Co-produced and mixed by Joe Barresi at Bay7 Studios, Los Angeles, USA
Assistant Engineer: Mike Gardner
Recorded at Earshot Studio, Bergen, Norway
Mastered by Peter In de Betou at TailorMade Production, Sweden

Notes

2005 debut albums
Audrey Horne (band) albums